The Cow ( Korova) is a 1989 Soviet animated short film directed by Aleksandr Petrov. It tells the story of a boy who recalls how his family lost its cow. The film is based on a short story by Andrei Platonov and was made using paint-on-glass animation.

Accolades
The film competed at the 40th Berlin International Film Festival, where it received an Honourable Mention. It was nominated for the Academy Award for Best Animated Short Film. It received the Gran Prix of the Hiroshima International Animation Festival.

References

1980s animated short films
1989 animated films
1989 films
Films about cattle
Films based on short fiction
Films directed by Aleksandr Petrov
Paint-on-glass animated films
Soviet animated short films
Soviet drama films
1989 crime drama films